Pranami Sampradaya, also known as Pranami or Pranami Panth is a Hindu sect which worships the god Krishna as the Supreme God. It is based on teachings of Mahamati Prannathji and Shri Devchandraji with their holy scripture as Shri Tartam Sagar.

History
The founder of the sect, Shri Devchandra Ji Maharaj (1581–1655), was born in Amarkot in the Sindh province of India (present-day Pakistan). From early childhood, he showed saintly tendencies. At the age of 16, he renounced the world and left in search of Brahma-gyana (divine knowledge) to Bhuj in Kutch and later to Jamnagar. Devchandraji undertook the work of giving concrete shape and form to find a new stream of religion called Nijanand Sampradaya. He settled down in Jamnagar, where form he explained Vedas, Vedantic knowledge and Bhagwatam in simple language intelligible to lay persons irrespective of social class and religious differences, and awaken them to their real Self with the help of divine knowledge called "Tartam". His followers later came to be known as Sundarsaths or Pranami.

The credit of spreading the Pranami sampraday goes to his dearest disciple and successor, Mahamati Shri Prannathji (Mehraj Thakur) (1618–1694), who was the son of Keshav Thakur, Diwan of Jamnagar State. He traveled throughout the Indian subcontinent and the Arabian world including Oman, Iraq and Iran to spread the ideals of religious harmony and interfaith understanding the vision of Tartam professes. Through him was revealed the divine knowledge later compiled as the holy "Kuljam Swaroop" in six languages – Gujarati, Sindhi, Arabic, Persian, Urdu, Hindi and also words of many other prevalent languages. His work called Kuljam Swarup a.k.a. Tartam Sagar is worshipped similar to the Murtis of Shree Krishna Pranami temples worldwide. He also attended Kumbh Mela at Haridwar in 1735 BS (1678 AD) and was engaged in religious debates in which he became victorious and was conferred the title of "Niskalanka Bijayaabhinand Buddha Avatar" by the saints of various sects and creeds.

Maharaja Chhatrasal (1649–1731) (1649–1731) of Bundelkhand, was an ardent disciple of Mahamati Prannathji and a follower of  Pranami Dharma. Their meeting took place in Mau in 1683, a place near Panna. His nephew Dev Karanji who had met Swami Prannathji, earlier in Ramnagar, was instrumental for this meeting. Chhatrasal was highly impressed of Prannathji and became his disciple. When Maharaja Chhatrasal came to meet him, he was going for a battle against Mughals. Swami Prannathji gave him his own sword and covered his head with a scarf, saying, "You will always be victorious. Diamond mines will be discovered in your land and you will become a great emperor." His prophecy came true and even today Panna region is famous for their diamond mines. Swami Prannathji was not only the religious Guru of Chhatrasal; but he guided him too in political, social, and economic matters. It was by being granted the boon of finding diamonds in Panna by Swami Prannathji that Maharaja Chhatrasal became prosperous.

Among other notables – Mahatma Gandhi's mother, Putlibai, belonged to Pranami sect. Gandhi in his book My Experiments With Truth mentions about this sect -  "Pranami is a sect deriving the best of Gita and Quran, in search of one goal – Shri Krishna."

Kuljam Swaroop Vaani 
This compilation of 14 books consists the revelation of the Vedic Scriptures, as well as the description of the Supreme Abode Paramdham or Goloka Vrindavan. Due to this compilation having divine knowledge, the followers of Shree Krishna Pranami Faith worship this Holy book as the Lord himself. Tartam Sagar include 18,758 verses.

It is a collection of Mahamati Prannath's Vaani's or teaching. It was published in 1965 for the first time. The collection of fourteen books are: Raas, Prakash, Shatritu, Kalash, Sanandh, Kirantan, Khulasa, Khilwat, Parikrama, Sagar, Singaar, Sindhi Bani, Marfat Sagar, and Kayamatnama (chhota and Bada).

Veerat
It offers a stratified knowledge from the Hell (Purgatory) all the way to the Supreme Abode of the Lord Supreme Paramdham and enumerates everything in between. This holy text explains the history and reason behind the creation of this relative world among many facets of creation. It also gives the history of Adinarayana, who is considered by many 
as the Lord Supreme as well as Trinity (Brahma, Vishnu, Mahesh) and many other details of the divine intention behind Creation.

Vriti/Charchani
The detailed enumeration of the Abode of the Lord Supreme Shri Krishna as indicated in scriptures.

"Chidadityam Kishorangam Paredhamni Viraajitam
Swaroopam Satchindanandam Nirbikaram Sanaatanam"

Brahmabaibart Purana

"The Lord Supreme resides in his effulgent Abode (Paramdham) in his ever radiating youth form. Devoid of all the natural impurities, he is engrossed with Existence-Knowledge-Bliss features and is eternal."

Beetak Saheb (history)
It is the history of the advent of this great philosophy called Tartam that is to remove the darkness of spiritual misunderstanding and the biography of the founders of this faith Satguru Devchandra Jee and Mahamati Prannath Jee whose lives serve as inspiration for those who aspire to realize divinity and eternal bliss. The account of their lives recorded by the awakened soul Swami Lal Das Jee, the consort of the Lord Supreme and many other awakened souls outline
the ways for enlightenment and Salvation.

Many other books written by the leaders of the Pranami Faith and other religious scholars are available for readers to reflect on in many libraries and Pranami Temples and institutions worldwide.

Mantra
The "Nijanam Mantra" is used by followers and it is said to be the powerful mantra to get rid of this infinite loop of birth and death. This is the same mantra which is given when someone wants to enter in this sampardaye. This mantra is the summarized version of Tartam Sagar.

Rites and rituals

The followers of Nijanand Sampardaye are barred from alcohol intake, non-veg diets, tobacco products, etc. The followers recite hymns and verses from their holy book Kuljam Swarup a.k.a. Tartam Sagar, worship the Holy book as the Lord Himself.

In Nijanand  temples, which are dedicated to Shree Rajshyamaji (the Lord Supreme and his bliss part), ladies and gentlemen sit in separately to listen to the recitation of fragments of their holy scripture and sing devotional songs to the accompaniment of harmonium, drums (tabla and dholak) and small brass cymbals (manjiras). The walls of temple are covered by scripts from their books – which are inscribed both in Hindi and Sanskrit.

Distribution
Nijanand Sampraday followers though a minority sect of an offshoot Hinduism can be found in States of Gujarat, Rajasthan, New Delhi, Uttar Pradesh, Madhya Pradesh, Punjab, Haryana, Assam, West Bengal, Sikkim in India chiefly. The followers of Shree Krishna Pranami Faith are spread worldwide in recent times including the countries like Nepal, United States, Australia, Japan, United Kingdom, United Arab Emirates and Canada among others.

References

Hindu communities
Social groups of India
Krishnaite Vaishnava denominations
Bhakti movement
Anti-caste movements
Religions that require vegetarianism
Religious syncretism in Asia